Boys & Girls Clubs of America (BGCA) is a national organization of local chapters which provide voluntary after-school programs for young people. The organization, which holds a congressional charter under Title 36 of the United States Code, has its headquarters in Atlanta, with regional offices in Chicago, Dallas, Atlanta, New York City and Los Angeles. BGCA is tax-exempt and partially funded by the federal government.

History
The first Boys' Club was founded in 1860 in Hartford, Connecticut, by three women, Elizabeth Hamersley and sisters Mary and Alice Goodwin. In 1906, 53 independent Boys' Clubs came together in Boston to form a national organization, the Federated Boys' Clubs. In 1931, the organization renamed itself Boys' Clubs of America, and in 1990, to Boys & Girls Clubs of America. As of 2010, there are over 4,000 autonomous local clubs, which are affiliates of the national organization. In total these clubs serve more than four million boys and girls. Clubs can be found in all 50 states as well as locations in Puerto Rico, the Virgin Islands, and US military bases. In total, Boys & Girls Clubs of America employ about 50,000 staff members.

The Chronicle of Philanthropy ranked Boys & Girls Clubs of America number one among youth organizations for the 13th consecutive year, and number 12 among all nonprofit organizations. The Boys & Girls Clubs of America is the official charity of Major League Baseball. Denzel Washington, a former club member, has been the spokesperson for Boys & Girls Clubs of America since 1993.

Lists of founders

Boys Clubs of America, 1940
These people came together in 1940 to create the Boys Clubs of America:
 Herbert Hoover, 31st President of the United States
 William E. Hall, US Medal of Honor recipient
 Albert L. Cole, CEO of Reader's Digest
 James A. Farley, United States Postmaster General
 Albert C. Wedemeyer US Army Chief of Plans and Operations
 Matthew Woll, vice president of the AFL-CIO
 Jeremiah Milbank, two-time Republican Party Finance Committee chairman
 Stanley Resor, Secretary of the Army
 James B. Carey, president of AFL-CIO
 J. Edgar Hoover, director of the Federal Bureau of Investigation
 Lewis L. Strauss, chairman of the U.S. Atomic Energy Commission
 Robert E. Wood, quartermaster general of the army, vice-president of Sears
 Fred C. Church Jr., insurance businessman
 H. Bruce Palmer, president of the Mutual Benefit Life Insurance Company
 Edgar A. Guest, TV and radio host
 Nicholas H. Noyes, Indianapolis, Indiana; oil mogul
 George A. Scott, president, Walker-Scott Company
 E. E. Fogelson, Army colonel and cattle and oil baron
 Ernest Ingold of San Francisco, California
 Jesse Draper of Atlanta, Georgia
 Julius J. Epstein
 John Albert

Boys & Girls Clubs of America, 1990
In 1990, Boys Clubs of America was succeeded by Boys & Girls Clubs of America, which was founded by the following people:

 Gerald W. Blakeley, Jr., Boston, Massachusetts
 Roscoe Brown, Bronx, New York City, New York
 Cees Bruynes, Stamford, Connecticut
 Arnold I. Burns, New York, New York
 John L. Burns, Greenwich, Connecticut; President of the Boys' Clubs of America (1968–81), Chairman (1981–88)
 Hays Clark, Hobe Sound, Florida
 Mrs. Albert L. Cole, Hobe Sound, Florida
 Mike Curb, Burbank, California
 Robert W. Fowler, Atlantic Beach, Florida
 Thomas G. Garth, New York, New York
 Moore Gates, Jr., Princeton, New Jersey
 Ronald J. Gidwitz, Chicago, Illinois
 John S. Griswold, Greenwich, Connecticut
 Claude H. Grizzard, Atlanta, Georgia
 George V. Grune, Pleasantville, New York
 Peter L. Haynes, New York, New York
 James S. Kemper, Northbrook, Illinois
 Plato Malozemoff, New York, New York
 Edmund O. Martin, Oklahoma City, Oklahoma
 Donald E. McNicol, New York, New York
 Carolyn P. Milbank, Greenwich, Connecticut
 Jeremiah Milbank Jr., New York, New York
 C. W. Murchison III, Dallas, Texas
 W. Clement Stone, Lake Forest, Illinois

Notable members
Some notable members of the Boys & Girls Clubs of America:

 Ashanti
 General Wesley Clark
 Donnie Copeland
 Misty Copeland
 Lee Corso
 John Paul DeJoria
 John Duren
 Anthony Ervin
 Don Fisher
 Edward Furlong
 Cuba Gooding Jr.
 Natalie Gulbis
 Hulk Hogan
 Evander Holyfield
 Earvin "Magic" Johnson
 Jackie Joyner-Kersee
 Dante Lauretta
 Paul "Triple H" Levesque
 Jennifer Lopez
 Mario Lopez
 Vince McMahon
 Ne-Yo
 Danny Neaverth
 Edward James Olmos
 Shaquille O'Neal
 Sugar Ray Leonard
 Joey Reynolds
 Smokey Robinson
 CC Sabathia
 Adam Sandler
 Martin Sheen
 Usher
 Courtney B. Vance
 Denzel Curry
 Denzel Washington
 Kerry Washington
 Shaun White
 Katy Perry
 Michael Vick

Donations received 
Following the success of the film  Black Panther, in 2018 Disney donated $1million to Boys & Girls Clubs of America for the development of STEM programs in the United States. The donation was to be allocated to help grow the group's national STEM (Science, Technology, Engineering and Mathematics) curriculum.

According to Mimi LeClair, president and CEO of Boys and Girls Clubs of Chicago, it is very important for young people to have a solid background in STEM to compete in the global economy.

See also
 Boys & Girls Clubs of Philadelphia
 Boys & Girls Clubs of Canada
 Pegasus ArtWorks

References

External links
 
 Official history 

Organizations established in 1906
AmeriCorps organizations
Youth organizations based in the United States
History of Hartford, Connecticut
Organizations based in Atlanta
Patriotic and national organizations chartered by the United States Congress
1906 establishments in Massachusetts